The Marine Corps Special Operations Battalion, known as the Tonelero Battalion, located in the city of Rio de Janeiro, is the military unit of the Amphibious Commandos (COMANF), which are a troop of Special Forces of the Marine Corps of the Brazilian Navy. They are Marines specifically prepared for planning, conducting and executing Special Operations, Information Operations and Psychological Operations.

Purpose and organization 

This battalion has the main purpose, through Amphibious Commandos, to contribute to the execution of naval power, carrying out:

1st Special Operations Company 

Specialized Reconnaissance - RECON, pre-assault and post-assault reconnaissance actions are involved in support of landing forces, with highly qualified personnel as scuba divers or using the parachute as a means of infiltration with the mission of identifying and reporting enemy activities, conducting fires of support weapons, deploy sensors on the ground and guide operations with aircraft.

2nd Special Operations Company 

Commandos Action (Direct Actions), Commando actions aim to destroy or damage relevant objectives, retake facilities, capture or rescue personnel, obtain data, mislead and produce psychological effects.

3rd Special Operations Company 

Special Rescue and Recapture Group (GERR-OpEsp), the Special Rescue and Recapture Group (GERR), has the mission of rescuing military or civilian authorities kept in illegal confinement, counterterrorism, search and rescue of pilots slaughtered in combat and retake zones facilities of interest to the Navy and/or the Federal Government.

4th Command and Service Company 

Regarding the management of its material and human resources, the Battalion has a Command and Services Company and administrative autonomy through which it plans and executes the resources received from the Fleet Marine Force - FFE.

5th Special Operations Support Company 

Its task is to provide specialized combat service support, either on board, through the parachute folding and maintenance section, the diving support section and the vessel support section, or in the Marines Operative Grouping operations. The company organizes a Special Operations Support Detachment to work with the Marines Operative Grouping Combat Services Support Component, performing specialized support tasks, such as operating pneumatic landing craft, resupplying infiltrated special operations teams, or even carrying out the maintenance of specific material used in special operations, such as parachutes and diving equipment.

Special Operations Instruction Section 

Train the human resources belonging to the Marine Corps Special Operations Battalion; Contribute to the development of the doctrine of Special Operations in the Marine Corps; and Conduct research and experimentation with new operational techniques and equipment peculiar to Special Operations.

Symbols

Brevet 

The identifying symbol of the Amphibious Commandos is their hostile-looking brevet with a skull pierced by lightning; meaning the enemy's death and the speed and violence in his actions, an anchor; meaning loyalty to the Brazilian Navy and the ability to perform aquatic operations, a pair of wings; meaning ability to operate by air, and a blue headstone; meaning darkness, a formidable environment for the activities of the Amphibious Commandos.

Black cap 

Another identifying symbol of the Amphibious Commandos is the black cap that in the case of the Brazilian Marine Corps military personnel only the Amphibious Commandos use.

Weapons

Special forces of Brazil